Wixams railway station is a planned railway station that is due to be built on the Midland Main Line for the Wixams new town development in Bedfordshire, England. It is proposed that the station be between Bedford and Flitwick.

The station was due to be completed in 2015, but Network Rail withdrew their promise of funding. In 2017, Gallagher Estates applied for funding from the government for the station.

In July 2017, it was reported the site would be located further north as part of the East West Rail project.

In January 2019, East West Railway Company revealed 5 options for a potential Bedford-Cambridge route, with 3 of the options proposing a new station at Bedford South close to Wixams. However in January 2020, the preferred route was announced which does not include a Bedford South station.

In January 2022 Bedford Borough Council announced that it has chosen a preferred design for the new station. This design will now be put forward as a planning application, with completion of the station expected in 2024.

References

Proposed railway stations in England
Railway stations in Bedfordshire